Stenoglene pujoli is a moth in the family Eupterotidae. It was described by Ugo Dall'Asta and G. Poncin in 1980. It is found in the Central African Republic.

References

Endemic fauna of the Central African Republic
Moths described in 1980
Janinae